Lucifer's Friend is the first studio album by the hard rock band Lucifer's Friend, released in 1970. Lucifer's Friend would change directions multiple times on upcoming albums. However, the progressive and krautrock influenced proto-doom metal on this album lives up to the sinister cover.

Track listing

Side one
 "Ride the Sky" (Hesslein, Lawton) 2:55
 "Everybody's Clown" (Rietenbach, Horns, Docker, Hecht, Hesslein) 6:12
 "Keep Goin'" (Horns, Docker, Hecht, Hesslein) 5:26
 "Toxic Shadows" (Docker, Hesslein) 7:00

Side two
 "Free Baby" (Horns, Lawton, Hecht, Hesslein) 5:28
 "Baby You're a Liar" (Rietenbach, Horns, Docker, Hecht, Hesslein) 3:55
 "In the Time of Job When Mammon Was a Yippie" (Horns, Docker, Hecht, Hesslein) 4:04
 "Lucifer's Friend" (Rietenbach, Horns, Hildebrandt-Winhauer, Hecht, Hesslein) 6:12

Bonus tracks from the 1990 re-release
 "Rock 'n' Roll Singer" (Hesslein, Lawton) 4:21
 "Satyr's Dance"  3:17
 "Horla" (Rietenbach, Horns, Docker, Hecht, Hesslein) 2:52
 "Our World Is a Rock 'n' Roll Band" (Becker, Docker) 3:20
 "Alpenrosen" (Horns, Bornhold, Hecht, Hesslein) 3:53

Bonus tracks from the 2010 re-release
 "Horla" (Rietenbach, Horns, Docker, Hecht, Hesslein) 2:53
 "Lucifer's Friend" (Radio Edit) (Rietenbach, Horns, Hildebrandt-Winhauer, Hecht, Hesslein) 3:43

Personnel

Musicians
 John Lawton – lead vocals
 Peter Hesslein – lead guitars, vocals, percussion
 Peter Hecht – organ, piano, French horn (on "Ride the Sky")
 Dieter Horns – bass, vocals
 Joachim Rietenbach – drums, percussion

Production
 Günther Zipelius – engineer
 Henning Ruete, Horst Andritschke – mixing
 Juligan Studio – photography and cover design
 Herbert Hildebrandt-Winhauer – producer
 Lucifer's Friend – co-producer

References

External links
 

1970 debut albums
Lucifer's Friend albums
Philips Records albums